Mario de Sárraga (born 22 August 1980, in Oviedo) is a former Spanish cyclist.

Palmarès
2003
1st Gran Premio Cuéllar – Clásica de la Chuleta
1st Memorial Cirilo Zunzarren
1st GP Virgen del Cristo- Palencia
2004
1st Coppa Sportivi Malvesi
1st Trofeo Edilizia Mogetta

References

1980 births
Living people
Spanish male cyclists
Sportspeople from Oviedo
Cyclists from Asturias